The sixth season of Australian reality television series The Block, titled The Block: Sky High, premiered on Sunday, 12 May 2013 at 6:30 pm on the Nine Network. Scott Cam (host) and Shelley Craft (Challenge Master) returned from the previous season, as did the three judges: Neale Whitaker, Shaynna Blaze and Darren Palmer. Production for the series returned to Melbourne, which was the location for the fourth and fifth seasons, in the suburb of South Melbourne.

Contestants
This season introduces five couples (an increase from the four couples in preceding seasons) with each couple originating from a different state of Australia. The couples selected were as follows:

Score history

Results

Room Reveals

Judges' Scores

  The Block contestants were told to score each other's rooms. The scores were then tallied up to give a total "Blockheads" score which was then added to the judges' scores.
  John McGrath filled in for Neale Whitaker in judging the rooms this week.
  The prize for this week, is a trip to Lizard Island for 2 nights instead of $10,000 cash. Panic Room - as their second room for the week, they were told to redo the room that the judges disliked the most:-
 Alisa and Lysandra - Guest Bedroom #1
 Matt and Kim - Guest Bedroom #1
 Bec and George - Study Room
 Madi and Jarrod - Foyer
 Trixie and Johnno - Dressing Room

Challenge Scores

  The contestants had to use the bedhead they made, in one of the bedrooms of their apartment. Since there were two winners, they took home $2,500 each.
  Contestants were given $3,000 to open their own stall. They got to keep any amount they made over the three days the stalls were open. The teams made a total of $10,270 over the three days. Five safety deposit box keys were also up for grabs for the best designed/dressed stall. The winner got three safety deposit keys, the runner-up was given two keys.
  George and Jarrod went on the catwalk as a couple, and ended up with 1 key each. Bec and Madi were thus forced to be a couple for the catwalk.
  The contestants raced on the home straight inside a zorb ball on Family Day at the Caulfield Races.
  Cutouts of Scott Cam were placed along the race track, cutout also had a prize, being a tradie for a day:-
 Alisa and Lysandra - Plumber
 Matt and Kim - None
 Bec and George - Tiler
 Madi and Jarrod - Plaster
 Trixie and Johnno - Sparky (Electrician), Carpenter
  The $10,000 prize money was split between the levels depending on the number of votes that they received. The amount that each team received is listed in brackets after the number of votes they received. Each vote was worth $20; 25 'votes' went missing, so the total amount won is $500 short.
  Alisa and Lysandra & Matt and Kim joined forces and agreed to split the money they both won 50/50.

Auction

• Alisa & Lysandra win the block with $4000 profit lead over Madi & Jarrod

Ratings
 Colour key:
  – Highest rating episode and week during the series
  – Lowest rating episode and week during the series

Ratings data is from OzTAM and represents the live and same day average viewership from the 5 largest Australian metropolitan centres (Sydney, Melbourne, Brisbane, Perth and Adelaide).

References

2013 Australian television seasons
7